Thapathali Durbar was a palace complex in Kathmandu, the capital of the Nepal. Thapathali means abode of the Thapas. It was initially built by Nain Singh Thapa of the Thapa dynasty but was later occupied by Jung Bahadur Rana, as prime minister, the executive head of Nepal. The palace complex, located north of the Bagmati river, encompasses an impressive and vast array of courtyards, gardens, and buildings. Many palaces and buildings were built throughout late 1840s to 1900, initially by Nain Singh Thapa, a member of the aristocratic Thapa family and brother of Bhimsen Thapa, and later was acquired by Nain Singh Thapa's grandson Jung Bahadur Rana. Further additions were made by successive Ranas up to the 19th century.

History
The palace complex lay in the heart of Kathmandu, to the north of the bagmati river. The history of the palace is closely linked with the history of Nepal and its rulers.

Under Thapa dynasty
Starting with royal courtier family Thapa, who were in power until the death of last Thapa PM Mathabarsingh Thapa.Nain Singh Thapa, father of PM Mathabarsingh Thapa was credited with initiating construction of the palace complex who build a palace complex spreading over 80 Ropanis. Bhimsen Thapa left the place Thapathali to reside at Bagh Durbar.

Under Rana dynasty

Rakshya Kumari, mother of Jung Bahadur Rana was daughter of Kaji Nain Singh Thapa, brother of PM Bhimsen Thapa.
After the fall of the Thapa aristocracy, Jung Bahadur Rana began to live in his grandfather's Thapathali durbar. After Bhandarkhal Parva in 1848, he was able to seize all of the immediate property of his maternal uncle PM Mathabarsingh Thapa and grandfather PM Bhimsen Thapa.  During this acquisition, Jung also acquired the Thapathali durbar complex. As head of all state affairs, Jung Bahadur built a new lavish palace within the Thapathali complex under his royal architect Ransur Bista  but later after the construction in 1855 he gave it to his son Jagat Jung. In 1886 Jagat Jung moved to Manohara Durbar and gave this palace to his son Juddhapratap Jung.
 
In 1887, Juddhapratap Jung was murdered by the cunning Shumsher Ranas, sons of Dhir Shumsher JBR. Taking this opportunity, Chandra Shumsher JBR captured this palace complex and stayed there for 18 years until 1904. After Chandra Shumsher's death, his son Singha Shumsher JBR inherited the Thapathali Durbar Complex and named it Singha Mahal.

Singha Mahal
After Chandra Shumsher's death, his son Singha Shumsher JBR inherited the Thapathali Durbar Complex and named it Singha Mahal. Singha mahal is currently occupied by Nepal Rastra Bank.

Thapathali Vaidyakhana(Hospital)
After Jung Bahadur Rana's official visit to London in 1850, he established an Ayurvedic hospital in the Thapathali Durbar Complex for public use. This hospital was made free for the public but charged fully to Rana family members and aristocratic family members.

Vaidyakhana was closed after the 1886 Army Mutiny in Nepal. Later this property was acquired by Dev Shumsher JBR. After overthrowing Dev Shumsher JBR from prime ministership along with all his properties this vaidyakhana was also inherited by his sons.

Kal mochan temple

Kalmochan temple, dedicated to the Hindu god Lord Vishnu the preserver, was a part of the Durbar complex. It was built around the mid-19th century outside the walls. It was built in the Moghul Kathmandu-Gothic architecture style and has Mughal art and Nepali art. It is also known as Janga Hiranya Hemnarayan mandir. It is located at kalmochan ghat in Thapathali. It was built by Rana prime minister Jung Bahadur Rana. He named it after his two wives Hiranya Garbha and Hem, whereas Narayan means god Bishnu. He built this temple to attain inner peace (mochan) as he was involved in many murders. It is believed that Jung Bahadur Rana had buried the dead bodies of people who died in Kot (Arsenal) Parva (massacre) under this temple.

The April 2015 earthquake of Nepal reduced this temple to rubble. The temple was not in good shape for quite some time. The visual scars were evident in this structure, a large shear crack on the eastern wall and along edges of the roof after 2011 Sikkim earthquake of India. The entire Kalmochan Ghat is in a dilapidated situation after the last quake.

See also
Bhimsen Thapa
Mathabarsingh Thapa
Jung Bahadur Rana

References

Thapa palaces of Nepal
palaces in Kathmandu